Scapegoat is a 2011 Turkish comedy film, directed by Cenk Özakıncı, starring Şahin K as a man with a dubious reputation trying to start a new life and win back his estranged son.

Production
The film was shot on digital equipment supplied by Arri and Weisscam.

Plot
Şahin K. is a wealthy and famous (or, rather, infamous) man who is discontented with his life. All he wants is to leave behind his past in Germany, wipe the slate clean and start leading a normal, low profile life in the southwest coastal town of Bodrum. In the meantime, he is also trying to win back his estranged son, who turned his back on him years ago because of his infamous career. However, as Şahin K. strives to win back his son, he unwillingly becomes a local hero to whom the entire town turns to get their problems solved.

Cast
 Sahin Yilmaz as Sahin K
 San Bingöl as Caner
 Ferdi Kurtuldu as Serdar
 Turgay Tanülkü as Tevfik
 Diler Ozturk as Hibnos
 Nebil Sayin as Macit

Release

See also
 2011 in film
 Turkish films of 2011

References

External links 

 

2011 comedy films
2011 films
Films set in Turkey
2010s Turkish-language films
Turkish comedy films